The southernmost persistent glacial masses in Europe are mainly small glaciers, glacierets, and perennial firn fields and patches, located in the highest mountains of the three big southern European peninsulas - the Balkan, the Apennine, and the Iberian, the southernmost ranges of the Alps and the glaciers on the european northwestern slopes of the Greater Caucasus mountains in Russia. There are summer lasting snow patches in Sierra Nevada (Corral de la Veleta glacier at 37°03′24″ disappeared completely for a first time in 1913), in Mount Olympus (40°05′08″) (Kazania cirque), in Mount Korab (41°47′28″), in Rila Mountain (the cirque of the Seven Rila Lakes, Musala and Malyovitsa (42°10′25″) ridges), in Picos de Europa (43°11′51″) in the Cantabrian Mountains, in Mount Maglić (43°16′52″) and others. However, none of them have both persistency and indications of dynamic motion. In southern direction, some 4000 km away, are the glaciers in Africa in Rwenzori Mountains (00°23′09″N), Mount Kenya (00°09′03″S) and Mount Kilimanjaro (03°04′33″S).

List by latitude:

1. Mount Bazarduzu northeast slope glaciers (41°13′28″), Greater Caucasus, Russia/Azerbaijan

2. Snezhnika glacieret (41°46′09″), Pirin massif, Bulgaria

3. Banski Suhodol Glacier (41°46′54″), Pirin mountain, Bulgaria

4. Mertur cirque glacier (42°23’55”), Hekurave range, Prokletije mountains, Albania

5. Maja Jezercë glaciers and glacierets (42°26’27”), Prokletije mountains, Albania

6. Calderone glacier (42°28′10”) Gran Sasso massif, Apennine Mountains, Italy

7. Kolata glacieret (42°29′00”), Kolata massif, Prokletije, Albania/Montenegro

8. Aneto glacier (42°37′32”), Aneto-Maladeta, Pyrenees, Spain

9. Posets glacier (42°39′10”), Pyrenees, Spain

10. Monte Perdido glacier (42°40′38”), Pyrenees, Spain

11. Mount Dzhimara Glacier (42°43′15″), the european northwestern slopes of Mount Dzhimara, Khokh Range, Greater Caucasus, Russia

12.  Kolka Glacier (42°44′23″), the european northwestern slopes of Mount Kazbek, Khokh Range, Greater Caucasus, Russia

13. Picos del infierno glacierets (42°46′49”), Pyrenees, Spain

14. Debeli Namet glacier (43°06′50”), Durmitor, Montenegro

15. Monte Clapier glacier (44°06′44″), Maritime Alps, Italy

16. Monte Argentera glaciers (44°10′40″), Maritime Alps, Italy

See also
List of glaciers in Europe
List of mountains in Albania
List of mountains in Bulgaria
List of European ultra-prominent peaks
List of the highest European ultra-prominent peaks
Most isolated major summits of Europe

References

Glaciers of Europe
Lists of glaciers